Massachusetts Hall is the oldest surviving building at Harvard College, the first institution of higher learning in the British colonies in America, and second oldest academic building in the United States after the Wren Building at the College of William & Mary. As such, it possesses great significance not only in the history of American education but also in the story of the developing English Colonies of the 18th century. Massachusetts Hall was designed by Harvard Presidents John Leverett and his successor Benjamin Wadsworth. It was erected between 1718 and 1720 in Harvard Yard. It was originally a dormitory containing 32 chambers and 64 small private studies for the 64 students it was designed to house. During the siege of Boston, 640 American soldiers took quarters in the hall. Much of the interior woodwork and hardware, including brass doorknobs, disappeared at this time.

While designed as a residence for students, the building has served many purposes through the years. After Thomas Hollis donated a quadrant and a 24-foot telescope in 1722, for example, the building housed an informal observatory.

Currently, the President of the University, Provost, Treasurer, and Vice Presidents have offices that occupy the first two floors and half of the third. Freshmen reside in the fourth floor.

Massachusetts Hall, as Harvard's oldest extant dormitory, has housed many influential people. Founding Fathers who lived in Massachusetts Hall include John Adams, John Hancock, Samuel Adams, Elbridge Gerry, and James Otis. Members of the Wigglesworth, Weld, Thayer, Eliot, and Lowell families (among others), whose names now grace other dormitories, also lived in Massachusetts Hall. More recent notable residents of Massachusetts Hall include Alan Jay Lerner, Elliot Richardson, John Harbison, and Jeff Schaffer.

See also
 List of National Historic Landmarks in Massachusetts
 National Register of Historic Places listings in Cambridge, Massachusetts

References

External links
 National Park Service, Survey of Historic Sites and Buildings - Massachusetts Hall 
 Harvard Virtual Tour - Massachusetts Hall
 Harvard Crimson - For Sale by Owner: Historic Colonial

Harvard Freshman Dormitories
National Historic Landmarks in Cambridge, Massachusetts
School buildings completed in 1720
Harvard Square
University and college buildings on the National Register of Historic Places in Massachusetts
Historic district contributing properties in Massachusetts
1720 establishments in Massachusetts
National Register of Historic Places in Cambridge, Massachusetts
Homes of United States Founding Fathers